Carl Borden (born January 7, 1977, in Dayton, Ohio) is an American composer, record producer, recording artist, and engineer of new-age music. A graduate of Valencia College in Orlando, Florida, he is best known for his work with former Atlantic Records recording artist Men At Large. His music has been featured on The Fox television series Scream Queens and the VH1 TV series Single Ladies.

In 2014, Home, co-written and produced by Borden (performed by Dave Tolliver of Men At Large), peaked on the Billboard Hot Singles Sales chart at No. 4.

In 2016, he signed with record label Real Music and released his debut new age album Echoes of Bliss which earned two Global Music Awards (Best New Age Album/Production). Music from the album was featured in Voices of the Hill: A Twinsburg Documentary. On April 28, 2017, his second release, Breathe spent eight straight weeks being featured on the iTunes bestseller chart for World Music. Breathe has charted in many countries around the world and on the Zone Music Reporter Charts, debuting at #37. In 2017, he worked as a recording engineer on the album A Musical Journey: Together in Peace by Rupam Sarmah which debuted on the Billboard World Music Charts at #6.

Discography

Studio albums 
 2016 - Urban Soundscapes 
 2016 - Echoes of Bliss
 2017 - Breathe
 2019 - "Morning Embrace"
 2020 - "Beyond The Sunrise"

Single Releases 
 2021 - "I’m Alright (Black Mental Health Alliance Theme)" with Michael Whalen (composer)
 2021 - "Good Morning Light"
 2022 - "Dreamscapes"

Other album appearances 
 2014 - Something Like The Greatest
 2016 - Forest Bathing
 2017 - Together In Peace: A Musical Journey
 2021 - "Myndstream’s Summer Flight"
 2022 - Myndstream's Ambient Sleep EP"

References

External links
 
 

Living people
1977 births
21st-century American composers
Record producers from Ohio